Patrick Beesly (27 June 1913 – 16 August 1986) was a British author and intelligence officer during World War II.

Early life
Beesly was the fifth of six children of Gerald Beesly and his wife Helen (née Chamberlain) who was a cousin of Neville Chamberlain. Beasley attended Oundle School following which he read history at Trinity College, Cambridge. He thus came from a markedly establishment type of background, significant in the light of his later conclusions as a historian regarding the fate of the RMS Lusitania. Like his brother Richard Beesly, who obtained an Olympic gold medal in rowing, he had an interest in boats and became captain of the boat club. He received further education at Bonn, Vienna, and Brussels.

Career and military background
Just before World War II, he joined the Royal Navy Volunteer Reserve (RNVR) in June 1939, became a Sub-Lieutenant (Special Branch), and was appointed to the Naval Intelligence Division (NID 2), in the section concentrating on France, Spain, and the Benelux countries. Subsequently, he became assistant to Lieutenant Commander (later Vice Admiral) Sir Norman Denning in the Operations Intelligence Centre (July 1940). His first assignment was with the activities of armed merchant raiders but from 1941 until the end of the war with Germany he worked on submarine tracking as Deputy to Commander Rodger Winn. He was promoted to Lieutenant Commander and acted as Intelligence Officer to the Commander in Chief, Germany, at Flesburg and Minden.

Post-military activities

He left the military in December 1945, receiving the American Legion of Merit (rank of Legionnaire) for his wartime services. He then made a career in private industry with Henry Hope & Sons Ltd, becoming its managing director in 1967 before retiring in 1974.

Intelligence and historical writings

Since by that time bans on writing about the intelligence services had been relaxed, he began writing about Intelligence operations.

Patrick Beesly's first book, Very Special Intelligence in 1977 was well received. He proceeded to write other works on related intelligence and historical themes, some of which involved some far-reaching conclusions.

British 'plot...to endanger the Lusitania  '

Patrick Beesly is known for his espousal of the view as a historian that in World War One the British Admiralty deliberately endangered , sunk while sailing without escort in 1915, among whose passengers were many Americans, to bring the United States into the war. At the time, the Admiralty was headed by First Lord of the Admiralty Winston Churchill.

Family
He married Pamela Mary Wildman in September 1939 and they had two daughters, Caroline and Judith.

Bibliography
 Very Special Intelligence.  Hamish Hamilton (1977). An account of British Naval Operational Intelligence Centre OIC.
 Very Special Admiral. Hamish Hamilton (1980).  A biography of Vice Admiral John Godfrey, director of Naval intelligence in World War II
 Room 40. Hamish Hamilton (1982). An account of Naval Intelligence during World War I.
 Ultra and the Battle of the Atlantic. Hamish Hamilton (1983)
 Convoy PQ 17: A study in intelligence and decision making. Hamish Hamilton (1986)

References

External links
 Patrick Beesly's biography

1913 births
1986 deaths
English naval historians
Royal Navy officers
People educated at Oundle School
20th-century English historians
English male non-fiction writers
RMS Lusitania
20th-century English male writers